is an arcade game by Namco, originally released in 1983 and distributed in the United States by Bally Midway. Running on the Namco Super Pac-Man hardware modified to support horizontal scrolling, the game features a mouse protagonist and cat antagonists, similar to Hanna-Barbera's Tom and Jerry cartoon series. The game has been re-released in several Namco arcade compilations. It spawned a handful of sequels and a 2013 animated web series developed by cartoonists Scott Kurtz and Kris Straub.

Gameplay

The player guides Mappy the police mouse through the mansion of the cats called Meowkies (Mewkies in Japan) to retrieve stolen goods, such as the Mona Lisa or a TV. The player uses a left-right joystick to move Mappy and a single button to operate doors. The mansion has six floors of hallways (four or five in some other versions) in which the stolen items are stashed. Mappy and the cats move between floors by bouncing on trampolines at various places in the house. Both Mappy and the cats can land on a floor on the way up, but not on the way down. When Mappy passes cats in the air, he is unharmed, but if he touches a cat he will lose a life. The trampolines break when Mappy bounces on them four times in a row, and the trampolines change color depending on how many times Mappy has used them without a rest. In addition to the Meowkies, the boss cat Goro (Nyamco in Japanese) also roams around. He is faster but less aggressive than the Meowkies.  Throughout the levels, Goro hides behind the different recoverable items. If Mappy recovers an item which Goro is hiding behind, the player receives 1000 points in addition to the score for the item. Items come in pairs; retrieving the second item in a pair immediately after the first multiplies the point value of the second item (x2, up to x6).

Doors only open towards their doorknobs. Hitting a cat with a door scores 50 points and stuns the cat. Meowkies and Goro can open doors but will get stunned unless the door opens away from them (doorknobs away), and they can walk through opened doors. They cannot open blue doors. Blue doors, when opened, blast a slow moving microwave in the direction of the doorknob that will trap any cats it touches and remove them from the board when the wave reaches the edge of the screen.  The more cats caught, the more points gained. If Goro is trapped by a wave, the score is doubled. Cats removed in this way return shortly from above.

A round is completed when all the loot is retrieved. If the player takes longer than usual to clear a round, a "Hurry" message appears after which the music speeds up and the cats move quickly and aggressively, and more Meowkies are added (two will appear ready to drop as the Meowkies normally do immediately following the "Hurry" message, and more Meowkies can arrive later on). If the player takes much longer after this, a green disc with Goro's face on it named the "Gosenzo Coin" will drop onto the top-middle platform and chase Mappy more effectively than the Meowkies as it can kill him while jumping. The Gosenzo can open doors and cannot be stopped by microwave doors or any objects.

The third round and every fourth round after is a bonus round. Mappy, unbothered by the cats, must bounce across a series of trampolines, popping fifteen different suspended red balloons (200 pts), with a "Goro" (2000 points) along the way. A bonus (5000 pts) is awarded if all the balloons are popped before the music ends. After every bonus round, a new feature is added to the gameplay, such as bells that freeze cats. The "Hurry" message will also appear sooner.

Ports and sequels

 In 2007, Mappy is a playable character in the PSP racing game Pac-Man World Rally.
 In September 2011, the mobile game  was released.
 In 2021, Mappy was released online by Hamster Corporation under the Arcade Archives brand for the Nintendo Switch and PlayStation 4.

Reception

In Japan, Game Machine listed Mappy in its June 1, 1983 issue as the third most-successful table arcade unit of the month. It also topped the Game Machine chart for new table arcade cabinets in June 1983. In 2015, Hardcore Gamer included Mappy on its 200 Best Video Games of All Time.

Legacy
As part of Bandai Namco's ShiftyLook initiative, an animated Mappy web series, titled Mappy: The Beat was made. The series was written and directed by Scott Kurtz and Kris Straub, who also performed all of the character voices, and it was designed with limited animation in the style of Kurtz and Straub's Blamimations series. The story follows Mappy, now working a thankless job as a security guard for his former foe Goro's company Nyamco. He is accompanied by his friends and fellow Nyamco employees, the laid-back digging-obsessed Dig Dug and the dim but good-natured Sky Kid, along with other Bandai Namco characters working at the office. Mappy: The Beat premiered on ShiftyLook's YouTube channel on July 22, 2013, and ran for 13 episodes, each roughly eight minutes in length, with the final episode released on January 20, 2014. Kurtz also made a guest appearance as Mappy on the concurrent Bravoman animated series, with Bravoman in turn appearing in the final story arc of Mappy, portrayed by guest voice Dax Gordine. Following the closure of ShiftyLook, their channel was removed from YouTube, making the episodes no longer officially available.

A costume based on Mappy is in LittleBigPlanet 3 in the Namco Classics DLC. 

A medley of tracks from Mappy is in the Pac-Land stage in Super Smash Bros. Ultimate and in one of Pac-Man's taunts.

A theme based on Mappy, featuring the game's characters, is in Pac-Man 99 as special DLC.

Notes

References

External links
 
 Mappyland
 Mappy on strategywiki.org 
 
 

 
1983 video games
2013 web series debuts
2014 web series endings
Arcade video games
Bandai Namco Entertainment franchises
Fictional police officers in video games
FM-7 games
Game Boy Advance games
Game Gear games
Midway video games
MSX games
Namco arcade games
NEC PC-6001 games
NEC PC-8001 games
NEC PC-8801 games
Nintendo Entertainment System games
Nintendo Switch games
Platform games
PlayStation 4 games
Sharp MZ games
Sharp X1 games
Video games about mice and rats
Video games about police officers
Video games developed in Japan
Virtual Console games
Virtual Console games for Wii U
IOS games
Works by Kris Straub
Hamster Corporation games
Multiplayer and single-player video games